Colo Halit Ahmet (born 1 January 1986) is a Swedish retired footballer.

Career

After trialing with Manchester United, one of the most successful English clubs, Tottenham Hotspur and Ipswich Town, Halit signed for Lyn Fotball in the Norwegian top flight.

By 2013, he was playing in the Swedish sixth division with Forssa BK

References

External links
 Colo Halit at Lagstatistik

Swedish footballers
Association football midfielders
1986 births
Living people
Association football wingers
Lyn Fotball players
IK Brage players
Dalkurd FF players
Forssa BK players
Swedish expatriate footballers
Expatriate footballers in Norway
Swedish expatriate sportspeople in Norway